Zarzecze may refer to the following places in Poland:

Silesian Voivodeship (south Poland)
Zarzecze, Katowice, a district of the city of Katowice
Zarzecze, Cieszyn County 
Zarzecze, Zawiercie County
Zarzecze, Żywiec County

Lesser Poland Voivodeship (south Poland)
Zarzecze, Nowy Sącz County
Zarzecze, Olkusz County

Łódź Voivodeship (central Poland)
Zarzecze, Bełchatów County
Zarzecze, Rawa County

Lublin Voivodeship (east Poland)
Zarzecze, Chełm County
Zarzecze, Puławy County
Zarzecze, Zamość County

Subcarpathian Voivodeship (south-east Poland)
Zarzecze, Nisko County
Zarzecze, Przeworsk County
Zarzecze, Rzeszów County
Zarzecze, Jasło County

Other voivodeships
Zarzecze, Podlaskie Voivodeship (north-east Poland)
Zarzecze, Pomeranian Voivodeship (north Poland)
Zarzecze, Świętokrzyskie Voivodeship (south-central Poland)
Zarzecze, West Pomeranian Voivodeship (north-west Poland)

Other uses
 the Polish name for Užupis, Lithuania

See also 
 Zarichchia (disambiguation)